The International Conference on Concurrency Theory (CONCUR) is an academic conference in the field of computer science, with focus on the theory of concurrency and its applications. It is the flagship conference for concurrency theory according to the International Federation for Information Processing Working Group on Concurrency Theory (WP 1.8). The conference is organised annually since 1988. Since 2015, papers presented at CONCUR are published in the LIPIcs–Leibniz International Proceedings in Informatics, a "series of high-quality conference proceedings across all fields in informatics established in cooperation with Schloss Dagstuhl –Leibniz Center for Informatics". Before, CONCUR papers were published in the series Lecture Notes in Computer Science.

 According to CORE Ranking, CONCUR has rank A ("excellent conference, and highly respected in a discipline area").
 According to Google Scholar Metrics (as of 20 July 2019), CONCUR has H5-index 21 and H5-median 34.

Editions 
 32nd CONCUR 2021: Paris, France Online
 31st CONCUR 2020: Vienna, Austria Online
 30th CONCUR 2019: Amsterdam, the Netherlands
 29th CONCUR 2018: Beijing, China
 28th CONCUR 2017: Berlin, Germany
 27th CONCUR 2016: Québec City, Canada
 26th CONCUR 2015: Madrid, Spain
 25th CONCUR 2014: Rome, Italy
 24th CONCUR 2013: Buenos Aires, Argentina
 23rd CONCUR 2012: Newcastle upon Tyne, UK
 22nd CONCUR 2011: Aachen, Germany
 21st CONCUR 2010: Paris, France
 20th CONCUR 2009: Bologna, Italy
 19th CONCUR 2008: Toronto, Canada
 18th CONCUR 2007: Lisbon, Portugal
 17th CONCUR 2006: Bonn, Germany
 16th CONCUR 2005: San Francisco, CA, USA
 15th CONCUR 2004: London, UK
 14th CONCUR 2003: Marseille, France
 13th CONCUR 2002: Brno, Czech Republic
 12th CONCUR 2001: Aalborg, Denmark
 11th CONCUR 2000: Pennsylvania State University, Pennsylvania, USA
 10th CONCUR 1999: Eindhoven, The Netherlands
 9th CONCUR 1998: Nice, France
 8th CONCUR 1997: Warsaw, Poland
 7th CONCUR 1996: Pisa, Italy
 6th CONCUR 1995: Philadelphia, PA, USA
 5th CONCUR 1994: Uppsala, Sweden
 4th CONCUR 1993: Hildesheim, Germany
 3rd CONCUR 1992: Stony Brook, NY, USA
 2nd CONCUR 1991: Amsterdam, The Netherlands
 1st CONCUR 1990: Amsterdam, The Netherlands
 Concurrency: Theory, Language, And Architecture 1989: Oxford, UK
 Concurrency 1988: Hamburg, Germany
 Seminar on Concurrency 1984: Pittsburgh, PA, USA

Test-of-Time Award 
In 2020, the International Conference on Concurrency Theory (CONCUR) and the  IFIP Working Group 1.8 on Concurrency Theory
established the CONCUR Test-of-Time Award. 
The goal of the Award is to recognize important achievements in concurrency theory that
have stood the test of time, and were published at CONCUR since its first edition in 1990.
 
Starting with CONCUR 2024, an award event will take
place every other year, and recognize one or two papers presented at CONCUR in the 4-year period from 20 to 17 years earlier.
From 2020 to 2023 two such award events are combined each year, in order to also recognize achievements that appeared
in the early editions of CONCUR.

2022

Period 2000–2003 

 Luca de Alfaro, Marco Faella, Thomas A. Henzinger, Rupak Majumdar & Mariëlle Stoelinga: "The Element of Surprise in Timed Games." (CONCUR 2003)
 James J. Leifer & Robin Milner: "Deriving Bisimulation Congruences for Reactive Systems." (CONCUR 2000)

Period 1998–2001 

 Franck Cassez & Kim Larsen: "The Impressive Power of Stopwatches" (CONCUR 2000)
 Christel Baier, Joost-Pieter Katoen & Holger Hermanns: "Approximate symbolic model checking of continuous-time Markov chains." (CONCUR 1999)

2021

Period 1996–1999 

 Rajeev Alur, Thomas A. Henzinger, Orna Kupferman & Moshe Y. Vardi: "Alternating Refinement Relations" (CONCUR 1998)
 Ahmed Bouajjani, Javier Esparza & Oded Maler: "Reachability Analysis of Pushdown Automata: Application to Model-checking" (CONCUR 1997)

Period 1994–1997 

 Uwe Nestmann & Benjamin C. Pierce: "Decoding Choice Encodings" (CONCUR 1996)
 David Janin & Igor Walukiewicz: "On the Expressive Completeness of the Propositional mu-Calculus with Respect to Monadic Second Order Logic." (CONCUR 1996)

2020

Period 1992–1995 

 Roberto Segala & Nancy Lynch: "Probabilistic Simulations for Probabilistic Processes" (CONCUR 1994)
 Davide Sangiorgi: "A Theory of Bisimulation for the pi-Calculus" (CONCUR 1993)

Period 1990–1993 

 Rob van Glabbeek: "The Linear Time-Branching Time Spectrum" (CONCUR 1993)
 Søren Christensen, Hans Hüttel & Colin Stirling: "Bisimulation Equivalence is Decidable for all Context-Free Processes" (CONCUR 1992)

Affiliated events 

 International Conference on Formal Modeling and Analysis of Timed Systems (FORMATS)
 International Conference on Quantitative Evaluation of SysTems (QEST)

See also 

 List of computer science conferences
 List of computer science conference acronyms
 List of publications in computer science
 Outline of computer science

References

External links 
 DBLP Page of CONCUR Conferences

Computer science conferences